Daryll Jones is a former safety in the National Football League.

Biography
Jones was born Daryll Keith Jones on March 23, 1962 in Georgia.

Career
Jones was drafted by the Green Bay Packers in the seventh round of the 1984 NFL Draft and spent two seasons with the team. During his final season he was a member of the Denver Broncos.

He played at the collegiate level at the University of Georgia.

See also

List of Green Bay Packers players

References

Players of American football from Columbus, Georgia
Green Bay Packers players
Denver Broncos players
American football defensive backs
University of Georgia alumni
Georgia Bulldogs football players
Living people
1962 births